Mirza Hadi Beg (fl. 1530 CE) was an Indian nobleman and Qadi (Islamic judge) of Central Asian origin and a direct ancestor of Mirza Ghulam Ahmad the founder of the Ahmadiyya movement. He migrated from Samarqand, in what is today Uzbekistan, to northern India and settled in the Punjab during the 16th century. Hadi Beg was a collateral kin of Babur, the founding emperor of the Mughal dynasty in the Indian subcontinent, but was not a Timurid.

Biography

Background
Mirza Hadi Beg was a Barlas nobleman and scholar and a direct descendant of Hajji Beg Barlas, a paternal relative of Timur, the 14th century ruler of Persia and Central Asia. The Barlas were originally a prominent Turco-Mongol tribe who controlled territories in the Transoxianian region of Kish (modern Shahrisabz, some 80 km south of Samarqand). Following Timur's rise to power within the tribe and amidst his conflict with Hajji Beg as leader of the Barlas, the family fled, with other members of the tribe, to Khorasan where they remained until the 16th century. In the early part of this century, Hadi Beg returned to the homeland of his ancestors and settled in Samarqand but left the city in 1530, perhaps due to domestic dissensions or an affliction, and moved along with his family and a retinue of two hundred persons consisting of servants and followers to northern India where the emperor Babur had recently established the Mughal dynasty.

In India

During the final year of Babur's reign, the family settled in the Punjab where Hadi Beg established a walled and fortified village near the River Beas and named it Islampur. He was granted a large tract of land comprising several hundred villages that together resembled a semi-independent territory by the imperial court of Babur and was also appointed the Qadhi (magistrate) of the surrounding district thereby giving him legal jurisdiction (Qadiyat) over the area. As the village was associated with the seat of the Qadhi, it came to be known as Islampur-Qazi. This name evolved into various forms based on cognates and the local dialect, until Islampur was dropped altogether, and it came to be known simply as Qadian, the name by which it is still known today.

Descendants
Hadi Beg’s descendants held Qadian for over 300 years maintaining close relations with the Mughal rulers and holding important offices within the imperial government. At its height, the family commanded a force of 7,000 soldiers under the Mughal emperor and, following the decline of Mughal power, were able to obtain de facto regional autonomy, becoming, in effect, the quasi-independent rulers of some sixty square miles. Most of this estate was lost however, first to the Sikhs in the 18th century and then to the British in the 19th. Perhaps the best known descendant of Hadi Beg was Mirza Ghulam Ahmad who founded the Ahmadiyya movement.

See also
Mirza Ghulam Murtaza
Mirza Faiz Muhammad
Mirza Gul Muhammad

Citations

References
 
 
 
 
 
 

Indian Muslims
Mughal nobility
People from Samarkand
Punjabi people
Indian people of Turkic descent
Family of Mirza Ghulam Ahmad